Alice Arm/Silver City Water Aerodrome, formerly , was located  south of Alice Arm, British Columbia, Canada. Alice Arm is located at the north end of Observatory and Portland Inlets, north of Prince Rupert.

The waterdrome was open year-round and was located across the bay from Kitsault.

References

Defunct seaplane bases in British Columbia
Regional District of Kitimat–Stikine